Dr. Maximus may refer to:

 Dr. Maximus, a character from the Planet of the Apes films
 Ibn Arabi, a 12th Century philosopher known as Dr. Maximus in medieval Europe